Ramzee Robinson (born February 20, 1984) is a former American football cornerback. He was drafted by the Detroit Lions with the last pick in the 2007 NFL Draft, earning the title of Mr. Irrelevant. He played college football at Alabama.

Robinson has also been a member of the Philadelphia Eagles. He is currently the Player Engagement Coordinator for the Kansas City Chiefs.

Early years
Robinson attended S. R. Butler High School where he played Quarterback and Cornerback for the Rebels.

College career
After redshirting in 2002, Robinson played four seasons with the Alabama Crimson Tide, making 50 appearances, including 36 starts. He recorded 143 tackles, including 3.5 tackles for a loss. Robinson broke up 22 pass attempts, forced 2 fumbles, and made 4 interceptions, including one for a touchdown in the 2006 season. He wore jersey number 1 and graduated in 2007 with a degree in business management.

Professional career

Detroit Lions
Robinson was drafted by the Detroit Lions with the last pick of the 2007 NFL Draft (255th overall), earning him the title of Mr. Irrelevant. On June 29, 2007, Robinson signed a three-year contract with the Lions. However, on September 1, 2007, he was cut by the Lions and assigned to the practice squad where he wore jersey #38. He was promoted to the active roster due to injuries to other players at his position for the Lions' week 7 game against the Tampa Bay Buccaneers where he notched two tackles on special teams. However, the next week the Lions signed another cornerback and Robinson was again demoted to the practice squad. Robinson was again activated to the 53-man roster and given a jersey for the team's week 13 game on December 2.

Robinson taunted Green Bay Packers wide receiver James Jones after an incomplete pass thrown by Green Bay quarterback Aaron Rodgers during the third quarter of their December 28, 2008 game. He danced around and pointed at Jones after the fourth-and-10 play, resulting in a 15-yard dead-ball penalty against Detroit. This is the same game in which the Lions' made history as the first NFL team to go winless in the modern 16-game regular season, which started in 1977. His behavior garnered harsh criticism from the media.

On September 6, 2009, the Lions released Robinson.

Philadelphia Eagles
On November 11, 2009, Robinson was signed to a one-year contract with the Philadelphia Eagles after cornerback Ellis Hobbs was placed on injured reserve due to a neck injury. He was waived on December 1, 2009.

Cleveland Browns
Robinson was claimed off waivers by the Cleveland Browns on December 2, 2009.

Washington Redskins
Robinson was claimed off waivers by the Washington Redskins on June 20, 2010.
Robinson was cut during final cuts on September 4, 2010

Denver Broncos
In March 2012, Robinson signed with the Broncos after spending 2010 and 2011 out of football. He was one of the final cuts.

Saskatchewan Roughriders
Robinson was released by the Roughriders on June 22, 2013.

References

External links
Cleveland Browns bio

1984 births
Living people
American football cornerbacks
Alabama Crimson Tide football players
Cleveland Browns players
Detroit Lions players
Philadelphia Eagles players
Sportspeople from Huntsville, Alabama
Players of American football from Alabama
Saskatchewan Roughriders players